ISO 9847, Solar energy -- Calibration of field pyranometers by comparison to a reference pyranometer, is an ISO standard for the calibration of pyranometers.

References 

09847
Meteorological instrumentation and equipment